General elections were held in Tuvalu on 3 August 2006 to elect fifteen members to the Parliament. There were 5,765 eligible voters on the electoral roll. 32 candidates, including 2 women, competed for the 15 seats (the parliament had been increased from 12 to 15 elected members). All fifteen candidates elected were Independents, as there are no political parties in the country.

The years before the election had involved an uncertain economic situation with questions about the political stability with frequent changes of prime minister. There had also been questions about the integrity of some government ministers.

The election saw eight of the fifteen incumbent MPs defeated, including the entire cabinet of the incumbent Prime Minister Maatia Toafa (who did retain his seat).  Eight new members were elected to the parliament. The new members of parliament are predominantly experienced civil servants, including Taukelina Finikaso (former diplomat); Iakoba Italeli (former attorney general); Lotoala Metia (former auditor general); Namoliki Sualiki (former school principal); Willy Telavi (former police commissioner); and Falesa Pitoi (dentist).

Apisai Ielemia was elected the prime minister.

Results

Aftermath

On 14 August 2006 Apisai Ielemia was elected as prime minister; he had been a diplomat, clerk to parliament and senior civil servant. Kamuta Latasi was appointed the Speaker of the parliament. The new government sworn in by Governor General, Reverend Filoimea Telito on 14 August comprised Apisai Ielemia as Prime Minister and Minister of Foreign Affairs; Tavau Teii (Niutao) Deputy Prime Minister and Minister of Natural Resources; Willy Telavi (Nanumea) Home Affairs; Lotoala Metia (Nukufetau) Finance, Economic Planning and Industries; Kausea Natano (Funafuti) Public Utilities; Taukelina Finikaso (Vaitupu) Communications and Works; Italeli Taeia (Nui) Education, Sports and Health. Sir Tomu Sione (Niutao) acted as Chairman of the Caucus.

References

Elections in Tuvalu
Election
Tuvalu
Non-partisan elections
Election and referendum articles with incomplete results